This page provides the summary of RBBC1 North America Qualifier/Finals.

Since 2012, Red Bull BC One has held a qualifier for the World Final in the North America Region. The winner advances to the Red Bull BC One World Final.

Winners

2015

RBBC1 North American 2015 results 
Location: Orlando, United States

2014

RBBC1 North American 2014 results 
Location: Las Vegas, United States

2013

RBBC1 North American 2013 results 
Location: Houston, United States

2012

RBBC1 North American 2012 results 
Location: Chicago, United States

2011

RBBC1 USA Qualifier 2011 results 

note: Prior to 2012, Red Bull BC One held a USA qualifier specifically for boys from America.

Location: Chicago, United States

External links
 Red Bull BC One North American Finals 2013
 Red Bull BC One North American Qualifier 2012

Red Bull BC One